The Welsh Rugby Union Division Five East (also called the SWALEC Division Five East for sponsorship reasons) is a rugby union league in Wales.

Competition format and sponsorship

Competition
There are 11 clubs in the WRU Division Five East. During the course of a season (which lasts from September to May) each club plays the others twice, once at their home ground and once at that of their opponents for a total of 20 games for each club, with a total of 110 games in each season. Teams receive four points for a win and two point for a draw, an additional bonus point is awarded to either team if they score four tries or more in a single match. No points are awarded for a loss though the losing team can gain a bonus point for finishing the match within seven points of the winning team. Teams are ranked by total points, then the number of tries scored and then points difference. At the end of each season, the club with the most points is crowned as champion. If points are equal the tries scored then points difference determines the winner. The team who is declared champion at the end of the season is eligible for promotion to either the WRU Division Four East or the WRU Division Four South East based on geographical location. The two lowest placed teams are relegated into the WRU Division Six East.

Sponsorship 
In 2008 the Welsh Rugby Union announced a new sponsorship deal for the club rugby leagues with SWALEC valued at £1 million (GBP). The initial three year sponsorship was extended at the end of the 2010/11 season, making SWALEC the league sponsors until 2015. The leagues sponsored are the WRU Divisions one through to seven.

 (2002-2005) Lloyds TSB
 (2005-2008) Asda
 (2008-2015) SWALEC

2010/2011 Season

League Teams 
 Bettws RFC
 Blackwood Stars RFC
 Brynithel RFC
 Caldicot RFC
 Hartridge RFC
 Llanhilleth RFC
 Pontllanfraith RFC
 Monmouth RFC
 RTB (Ebbw Vale) RFC
 Trinant RFC
 Usk RFC
 Ynysddu RFC

2009/2010 Season

League Teams 
 Bettws RFC
 Blaenavon RFC
 Brynithel RFC
 Caldicot RFC
 Hartridge RFC
 Llanhilleth RFC
 Oakdale RFC
 Pontllanfraith RFC
 RTB (Ebbw Vale) RFC
 Trinant RFC
 Usk RFC
 Ynysddu RFC

2009/10 table

2008/2009 Season

League Teams 
 Abercarn RFC
 Bettws RFC
 Blaenavon RFC
 Caldicot RFC
 Llanhilleth RFC
 Oakdale RFC
 RTB (Ebbw Vale) RFC
 Talywain RFC
 Trinant RFC
 Usk RFC
 Ynysddu RFC

League table

2007/2008 Season

League Teams 
 Bettws RFC
 Blaenavon RFC
 Caldicot RFC
 Chepstow RFC
 Crumlin RFC
 Llanhilleth RFC
 Oakdale RFC
 RTB (Ebbw Vale) RFC
 Trinant RFC
 Usk RFC
 Ynysddu RFC

League table

2006/2007 Season

League Teams 
 Abertillery/Blaenau Gwent RFC - Champions (Promoted)
 Bettws RFC
 Blaenavon RFC
 Caldicot RFC
 Chepstow RFC
 Gwernyfed RFC - 2nd (Promoted)
 Llanhilleth RFC
 Oakdale RFC
 RTB (Ebbw Vale) RFC
 Usk RFC
 Ynysddu RFC

References

7